The 2010–11 WRU Challenge Cup: Tier 2, known for sponsorship reasons as the SWALEC Plate, is the 3rd WRU Challenge Cup: Tier 2, the annual national rugby union cup competition for middle division teams of Wales. The competition was won by Ammanford who beat Glynneath 35 – 13 in the final.

Calendar

Matches

Round 1

Round 2

Round 3

Round 4

Finals

Quarter-finals

Semi-finals

Final

External links
 WRU

Challenge Cup
WRU Challenge Cup
Wales Cup 2